The Magisterial Reformation "denotes the Lutheran, Calvinist [Reformed], and Anglican churches" and how these denominations "related to secular authorities, such as princes, magistrates, or city councils", i.e. "the magistracy". While the Radical Reformation that gave rise to the Anabaptist Churches rejected any secular authority over the Church, the Magisterial Reformation argued for the interdependence of the church and secular authorities, i.e. "The magistrate had a right to authority within the church, just as the church could rely on the authority of the magistrate to enforce discipline, suppress heresy, or maintain order."

In addition, the term magister relates to the emphasis on authoritative teachers. The theological schools that are collectively known as Magisterial Protestants include the Lutheran, Reformed, and Anglican traditions of Christianity.

References

Protestant Reformation
Christian terminology